The Deputy to the Prime Minister of Norway (Norwegian: Norges stedfortredende statsminister) was an office in the second cabinet of Kåre Willoch (1985-1986) and the first cabinet of Kjell Magne Bondevik (1997-2000).

From 1905 to 1985, the Minister of Foreign Affairs acted as the Prime Minister's de facto but not de jure deputy.  Outside of these periods, other cabinet ministers have acted as unofficial deputies to the Prime Minister, especially from smaller parties in coalitions.

Deputies

References 

Politics of Norway
Norway